Slovakia competed at the 2017 World Games held in Wrocław, Poland.

Medalists

Dancesport 

Lubomir Mick and Adriana Dindofferova competed in the Standard competition.

Filip Kočiš and Andrea Hrušková competed in the Rock'n'Roll competition.

Karate 

Ingrida Suchánková won the bronze medal in the women's kumite 61 kg event.

Dominika Tatarova competed in the women's kumite +68 kg event without advancing to the semi-finals.

References 

Nations at the 2017 World Games
2017 in Slovak sport
2017